SMS Lissa, named for the Battle of Lissa, was a unique ironclad warship built for the Austro-Hungarian Navy in the 1860s and 1870s, the only member of her class. She was the first casemate ship built for Austria-Hungary, she was armed with a main battery of twelve  guns in a central armored casemate, unlike the earlier broadside ironclads. Construction of the ship lasted from June 1867 to May 1871, and was delayed by budgetary shortfalls; the lack of funding also plagued the ship during her career, preventing her from taking an active role in the fleet. She spent the majority of her time in service laid up in Pola, apart from a lengthy reconstruction in 1880–1881. Lissa was ultimately stricken from the fleet in 1892 and broken up for scrap starting the following year.

Design

General characteristics and machinery

Her draft was fairly deep compared to other Austro-Hungarian ironclads of the time. She displaced . Her hull and most of the upper works, including the casemate, were wooden with iron plating attached, though the sides on either end of the casemate were iron-built. The ship was fitted with a ram bow. She had a crew of 620 officers and enlisted men.

Steam was provided by seven boilers with thirty fireboxes; the boilers were trunked into a single funnel located amidships.

Armament and armor
Lissa was a casemate ship, and she was armed with a main battery of twelve  breech-loading guns manufactured by Krupp's Essen Works. The other two guns were placed in a smaller redoubt mounted directly above the main casemate that hung over the lower casemate and allowed for limited end-on fire for some of the guns. She also carried several smaller guns, including four 8-pounder muzzle-loading, rifled (MLR) guns and two 3-pounder MLR guns.

Service history
Lissa was laid down on 27 June 1867 at the Stabilimento Tecnico Triestino (STT) shipyard in San Marco. She was launched on 25 February 1869 and began fitting-out work. The following month, Kaiser Franz Joseph visited the shipyard where Lissa was being built. Completion of the ship was delayed due to limited budgets for the Navy and the significant expense of importing the vessel's armor plate from Britain, and Lissa was not completed until May 1871. Not only did objections to naval expenditures from the Hungarian half of the Dual Monarchy delay construction of Lissa, but they also constrained the general naval budget, which prevented the fleet from being active in peacetime. The death of the fleet commander, Wilhelm von Tegetthoff, in 1871 exacerbated the budgetary problems, as his replacement, Friedrich von Pöck, lacked the prestige to convince the government to increase funding. The ironclad fleet, including Lissa, was kept out of service in Pola, laid up in reserve; the only vessels to see significant service in the 1870s were several steam frigates sent abroad.

Nevertheless, Lissa was formally assigned to the active ironclad squadron through 1887. During this period, Lissa had a serious accident on the night of 3–4 September 1872. While anchored off Corfu, a major fire broke out aboard the ship near the propellant magazine, though the crew was able to put it out before it could reach the highly explosive propellant charges. In 1875, the ship received new boilers, and the following year her rigging was modified. By 1880, the ship's hull was badly rotten, and so Lissa was taken into drydock at the Pola Arsenal, where the shipyard workers stripped off much of the vessel's armor plate to replace the deteriorated timber with new wood. The work was completed the following year, allowing the ship to return to service. While in drydock, the ship's armament was also revised; the original twelve 9-inch guns were retained, but the light battery was completely revised. The old MLRs were replaced with four  24-caliber guns and a pair of  15-cal. guns, and three  Hotchkiss guns and a pair of  auto-cannon were added.

After completing the overhaul, she returned to her place in the active squadron. Lissa took part in the fleet exercises held in June 1885, where she served as the flagship of the ironclad squadron. The maneuvers revolved around a mock attack by torpedo boats on the ironclad squadron off the island of Lissa. She remained on active service until 1888, when she was reassigned to the II Reserve. She received further modifications during this period, with torpedo launchers added in 1885 and new quick-firing versions of her main battery guns were installed. She was visited by Rudolf, Crown Prince of Austria on 27 March 1885. The ship remained in the Austro-Hungarian inventory, seeing little activity before she was stricken from the naval register on 13 November 1892. Lissa was broken up for scrap between 1893 and 1895.

Notes

References
 
 
 
 
 
 

Ironclad warships of the Austro-Hungarian Navy
1869 ships